Pedius is a genus of beetles in the family Carabidae, containing the following species:

 Pedius figuratus Wollaston, 1864
 Pedius inquinatus Sturm, 1824
 Pedius longicollis Duftschmid, 1812
 Pedius siculus Levrat, 1857

References

Pterostichinae
Carabidae genera